The year 2006 is the fifth year in the history of Cage Warriors, a mixed martial arts promotion based in the United Kingdom. In 2006 Cage Rage Championships held 8 events beginning with, CWFC: Quest 5.

Events list

CWFC: Quest 5

CWFC: Quest 5 was an event held on February 19, 2006 in Sheffield, England.

Results

CWFC: Enter the Wolfslair

CWFC: Enter the Wolfslair was an event held on March 5, 2006 in Liverpool, England.

Results

CWFC: Strike Force 5

CWFC: Strike Force 5 was an event held on March 25, 2006 in Coventry, England.

Results

CWFC: Quest 6

CWFC: Quest 6 was an event held on April 8, 2006 in Sheffield, England.

Results

CWFC: Strike Force 6

CWFC: Strike Force 6 was an event held on May 27, 2006 in Coventry, England.

Results

CWFC: Showdown

CWFC: Showdown was an event held on September 16, 2006 in Sheffield, England.

Results

CWFC: Showdown 2

CWFC: Showdown 2 was an event held on November 19, 2006 in Sheffield, England.

Results

CWFC: Enter The Rough House

CWFC: Enter The Rough House was an event held on December 9, 2006 in Nottingham, England.

Results

References

Cage Warriors events
2006 in mixed martial arts